Hajji Kola-ye Sanam (also Romanized as Ḩājjī Kolā-ye Şanam; also known as Ḩājjī Kolā) is a village in Balatajan Rural District, in the Central District of Qaem Shahr County, Mazandaran Province, Iran. At the 2006 census, its population was 1,010, in 243 families.

References 

Populated places in Qaem Shahr County